Carlo Tonon (25 March 1955, in San Vendemiano – 17 June 1996, in Stabiuzzo) was an Italian professional road bicycle racer.

He was a professional rider from 1982 through 1984 and twice started the Tour de France.

1984 Tour de France 
Tonon finished his first Tour de France for Carrera, where he rode alongside Guido Bontempi, in 1982 as 116th. He was again selected for the 1984 Tour de France where in the 19th stage he collided with a tourist while descending the Col de Joux-Plane. He was transferred to Annecy hospital with a fractured skull where he would stay in a coma for a couple of months and was eventually handicapped for life.

Death and legacy 
In 1996 Tonon committed suicide, hanging himself in his barn. He never totally recovered from his fall

From 2004, the Memorial Carlo Tonon e Denis Zanette is staged, in memory of Tonon and Denis Zanette, another Italian cyclist who died in 2003.

Palmarès 

1982
Tour de France:
116th
1983
Giro d'Italia:
134th

References

External links 

1955 births
1996 deaths
Cyclists from the Province of Treviso
Italian male cyclists
Suicides by hanging in Italy
1996 suicides